Châtillon-sur-Colmont (literally Châtillon on Colmont) is a commune in the Mayenne department in north-western France. The river Colmont flows through the commune.

See also
Communes of the Mayenne department

References

Chatillonsurcolmont